The 2012 BC Lions season was the 55th season for the team in the Canadian Football League and their 59th overall. The Lions finished the season in 1st place in the West Division for the second consecutive year with a 13–5 record. The Lions attempted to repeat as Grey Cup champions for the first time in franchise history, but lost the West Final to the Calgary Stampeders. The Lions also began the season with a new head coach for the first time since 2003, after long-time head coach Wally Buono resigned to focus on his duties as general manager.

Offseason

Free agents

CFL draft
The 2012 CFL Draft took place on May 3, 2012, live at 12:00 PM PDT.The Lions had four selections in the draft, after trading for another first round pick, trading away their second and fourth round picks, and forfeiting their sixth round pick. The Lions further traded up in the draft to select Jabar Westerman with the second overall pick. BC followed that with two offensive linemen (Kirby Fabien and Matt Norman) with their first and third round picks, before selecting linebacker Jordan Verdone in the fifth round.

Preseason

 Games played with colour uniforms.

Regular season

Standings

Season schedule

 Games played with colour uniforms.
 Games played with white uniforms.

Team

Roster

Coaching staff

Playoffs

Schedule

 Games played with colour uniforms.

West Final

References

BC Lions seasons
BC Lions
2012 in British Columbia